Nampont (or Nampont-Saint-Martin) is a commune in the Somme department in Hauts-de-France in northern France.

Geography
Nampont is situated on the banks of the Authie river, at the junction of the N1 and D12 roads and on the border of the departments of the Somme and the Pas-de-Calais.

Population

History

Places and monuments
The Maison Forte, built in the 15th century as a border-post on the Authie. After the Spanish invasion, it was transformed into a customs post for the imposition of the Gabelle (taxes levied on salt and other commodities), between Spanish Artois and French Picardy.

Nowadays, the Maison Forte is the clubhouse of Nampont-Saint-Martin golf club. Public access is limited to exterior views from the road or the courtyard.

See also
Communes of the Somme department

References

Communes of Somme (department)